Hatari! (Swahili for "Danger!") is a 1962 American adventure romantic comedy film starring John Wayne as the leader of a group of professional game catchers in Africa.  Directed by Howard Hawks, it was shot in Technicolor and filmed on location in northern Tanganyika (in what is now Tanzania). The film includes dramatic wildlife chases and the scenic backdrop of Mount Meru, a dormant volcano.

At the 35th Academy Awards, Russell Harlan was nominated for Best Color Cinematography for his work on Hatari!, but the award went to Freddie Young for his work on Lawrence of Arabia.

Plot
In Tanganyika in the 1960s, the Momella Game Company captures animals for zoos and circuses using off-road vehicles, lassos, and cages. Working for owner Frenchwoman Brandy de la Court is tough Irish-American Sean Mercer, who heads the capture expeditions; retired German race car driver Kurt Müller; Mexican Bullfighter Luis Francisco Garcia Lopez; Native American sharpshooter Little Wolf (aka "The Indian"); zoophobic former NYC cabbie "Pockets"; and several native-Tanzanians.

Kurt and the Indian drive a herding jeep to force animals toward a larger capture truck driven by Pockets. An aggressive rhino gores the Indian's leg during a pursuit; the crew transports him to Arusha hospital, where French marksman Charles "Chips" Maurey approaches them, wanting the Indian's job. Kurt, offended, punches him. Chips, the only one present with the Indian's blood type, agrees to undergo a transfusion to save him; Sean then offers him a job.

Returning to their compound, the crew finds Italian photographer Anna-Maria "Dallas" D'Alessandro has arrived, though everyone was expecting a male photographer. Because she was sent by the Basel zoo, Momella's biggest client, Sean reluctantly allows her to accompany the crew on a giraffe capture. Despite many rookie mishaps, Dallas enjoys herself, and everyone except Sean votes to let her stay.

The next day, Chips arrives and has a sharpshooting contest with Kurt; afterwards, the two become friends. Dallas and Sean gradually become mutually attracted, though Sean resists, as his first fiancée abandoned him. Meanwhile, Kurt and Chips actively pursue Brandy, while Pockets is secretly loves her. The Indian is released from the hospital; still shaken, he makes Sean agree to hold off capturing more rhinos until the end of the season.

On a multi-day trip, the crew passes through a village where a rogue female elephant has been killed by a game warden. They find her orphaned calf, and Dallas adopts it despite Sean's protests. Chaos ensues when the crew helps Dallas obtain goats to get milk for the calf; that night, Dallas apologizes to Sean, and coerces him into a kiss.

After another orphaned elephant calf shows up at the compound, the local Arusha tribe, impressed by how the elephants follow Dallas, adopt her into the tribe. They name her "Mama Tembo" ("Mother of Elephants"). A third elephant orphan later makes its way into the compound, infuriating Sean.

The crew capture a zebra, an oryx, a gazelle, a leopard, and a buffalo. Later, the herding car blows a tire and flips while pursuing a wildebeest; Kurt's shoulder is dislocated and Chips' leg is badly sprained in the wreck. The same day, Pockets falls off a tall fence. He is unhurt, but Brandy shows the most concern for him out of the three, indicating whom she loves.

Pockets successfully launches a small rocket attached to a net to trap nearly 500 vervet monkeys in a tree, surprising everyone, including himself. A rhino is the only order left to fulfill; the crew finds an angry bull rhino, and, although it escapes once, they safely capture it, much to the Indian's relief.

The season's work done, Dallas fears Sean will always see her as he saw his former fiancée; she writes a farewell letter and flees the compound. Sean, helped by the crew and the three baby elephants, tracks her to Arusha, where they reconcile. Sean and Dallas are married and prepare to spend their wedding night in Sean's room; however, the three elephants barge in and destroy the bed.

Cast
John Wayne as Sean Mercer
Hardy Krüger as Kurt Müller 
Elsa Martinelli as Anna Maria "Dallas" D'Alessandro
Red Buttons as "Pockets"
Gérard Blain as Charles "Chips" Maurey 
Bruce Cabot as Little Wolf ("The Indian")
Michèle Girardon as Brandy de la Court 
Valentin de Vargas as Luis Francisco Garcia Lopez
Eduard Franz as Dr. Sanderson
Cathy Lewis as the voice of "Arusha Control" on the radio (uncredited)
Queenie Leonard as Nurse (uncredited, scenes deleted)

Production
While Hatari! is bookended by the two attempts to capture a rhinoceros, it otherwise has a very loose script, and, like many other works by Howard Hawks, is principally structured around the relationships among the characters. At the start of production all Hawks knew was that he wanted to make a movie about people who catch animals in Africa for zoos, which he saw as a dangerous profession that would allow for exciting scenes, the likes of which had never been seen on-screen before. Much of the script was written by Hawks' favorite writer, Leigh Brackett, after the production returned from Africa with footage of the characters catching various animals, and before and during studio takes in Hollywood.

Hawks increased his knowledge of animal-catching by studying the work of the famous South African animal conservationist Dr. Ian Player. In 1952, South Africa was eliminating large wild animals to protect livestock, and only 300 white rhinos survived. Player then invented his famed rhino catching technique to relocate and save the white rhinos. His project was called "Operation Rhino", and it was recorded in the renowned documentary film of the same name.

Another source of inspiration for Hawks was the famous animal photographer Ylla, so he had Brackett add the character of Dallas to the script. Hawks said, "We took that part of the story from a real character, a German girl. She was the best animal photographer in the world."

Hawks stated in interviews that he had originally planned to star both Clark Gable, who had just played a rough-and-ready wild horse catcher (who did his own stunts) in The Misfits, and Wayne in the film, until Gable's death ruled that out.

Much of the film revolves around scenes of the cast chasing animals in jeeps and trucks across the plains of East Africa. Ngorongoro farm, purchased by Hardy Kruger after the filming, served as the movie's setting. The animals pursued are all live, wild, and untrained. Capturing animals by chasing them down is banned today both due to concerns over strain upon all those involved in a chase (targeted and not) and the development of effective animal tranquilizers and powerful dart guns to subdue those ultimately selected.

According to director Howard Hawks, all of the animal captures in the film were performed by the actors themselves—not by stuntmen or animal handlers (although a stand-in, Mildred Lucy "Rusty" Walkley, was used for some scenes involving Elsa Martinelli's character). When Hawks interviewed de Vargas, he said production would be very dangerous, as there would be no double, and showed de Vargas a documentary. Government-licensed animal catcher Willy de Beer was hired by Hawks as a technical adviser, and he and his assistants worked with the actors on how to go about catching the animals. During filming, the rhino really did escape and the actors had to recapture it, which Hawks included in the completed film for its realism.

Much of the audio in the capture sequences had to be re-dubbed due to John Wayne's cursing while wrestling with the animals, and Hawks said Wayne admitted being scared during some of the action scenes, particularly those in which he is sitting in the exposed "catching seat" as a truck hurtles over terrain full of hidden holes and obstacles. According to Hawks, Wayne "had the feeling with every swerve that the car was going to overturn as he hung on for dear life, out in the open with only a seat belt for support, motor roaring, body jarring every which-way, animals kicking dirt and rocks and the thunder of hundreds of hooves increasing the din in his ears." On the other hand, one evening, while Buttons and Wayne were playing cards outside, a leopard came out of the bush towards them, but, when Buttons mentioned the approaching leopard, Wayne reportedly simply said, "See what he wants."

Filming in Africa was not only dangerous for the actors, however. De Vargas said de Beer was mauled by a loose baby leopard that sprang on him from a tree, and "came back with his arm covered in bandages and throat completely wrapped, but he just shrugged it off."

As the animals frequently refused to make noise "on cue" (in particular, the baby elephants refused to trumpet inside populated areas), local Arusha game experts and zoo collectors were hired to do "animal voice impersonations" for the film.

Michèle Girardon spoke no English when she was cast and, according to a July 1961 LIFE magazine profile of the actress, she taught herself English while on the set.

John Wayne wore a belt with the famed "Red River D" from his starring role in Hawkes' iconic Red River on its buckle, as he did in many of his movies. It can be clearly seen in the scene where Sean Mercer radios "Arusha Control" after The Indian is gored by the rhino at the start of the film, and again in the scene where Sonja (the cheetah) wanders into the bathroom while Dallas is bathing and introduces herself by licking Dallas and purring.

The memorable Henry Mancini tune "Baby Elephant Walk" was written for and first appeared in Hatari!. Another memorable musical moment from the film is a duet of Stephen Foster's "Old Folks at Home" (aka "Swanee River"), with Dallas on piano and Pockets on harmonica.

Reception
Hatari! grossed $12,923,077 at the box office, $7 million of which came from U.S. theatrical rentals. It was the 7th highest-grossing film of 1962.

Jean-Luc Godard listed Hatari! as one of the best films of its year of release.

The film was recognized by American Film Institute in these lists:
 2005: AFI's 100 Years of Film Scores – Nominated

Novelization
Michael Milner adapted Leigh Brackett's screenplay for the film into a paperback novel published by Pocket Books in 1962 as a tie-in to the movie. The cover of the novel features the movie poster of the rhino attacking the catching truck. The novel goes into more detail about some aspects of the animal-catching, particularly Pockets' rocket-net project, as well as about the pursuit of Brandy by Kurt, Chips, and Pockets. The book is a bit edgier than the film, but it is a fast read and faithful to the movie. The novel's ASIN number is B000BJUQP4.

Comic book adaptation
 Dell Movie Classic: Hatari! (January 1963)

See also
 Hatari! Music from the Paramount Motion Picture Score, soundtrack album by Henry Mancini
 List of American films of 1962
 John Wayne filmography

References

External links

hatari in the Internet Living Swahili Dictionary

1962 films
1960s adventure drama films
1962 romantic drama films
American adventure drama films
American romantic drama films
1960s English-language films
Films directed by Howard Hawks
Films set in Tanganyika
Films shot in Tanzania
Paramount Pictures films
Films with screenplays by Leigh Brackett
Films scored by Henry Mancini
Films adapted into comics
Grammy Award for Best Engineered Album, Non-Classical
1960s American films